Sergei Aleksandrovich Filippenkov (2 August 1971 – 15 October 2015) was a Russian football manager and player.

Filippenkov died of a heart attack during a friendly match between former players on 15 October 2015.

Honours
 Russian Premier League runner-up: 1998.
 Russian Premier League bronze: 1999.
 Russian Cup runner-up: 2000.

International career
Filippenkov made his debut for Russia on 11 November 1998 in a friendly against Brazil.

References

External links
  Profile

1971 births
2015 deaths
Russian footballers
Russia international footballers
Russian expatriate footballers
Expatriate footballers in Kazakhstan
PFC CSKA Moscow players
FC Chernomorets Novorossiysk players
FC Zhenis Astana players
FC Metallurg Lipetsk players
FC Dynamo Saint Petersburg players
Russian expatriate sportspeople in Kazakhstan
Russian Premier League players
Russian football managers
FC Arsenal Tula players
Association football players who died while playing
Sport deaths in Russia
FC Kristall Smolensk players
Association football midfielders
FC Dynamo Bryansk players
FC Iskra Smolensk players